Sargocentron inaequalis, the lattice squirrelfish, also known as the roundfinned squirrelfish, is a species of squirrelfish in the genus of Sargocentron. It is found in the Indian Ocean in the Chagos Archipelago, Comoro Islands, Seychelles and Réunion, and in the Pacific Ocean in he Line Islands in Kiribati. It is an uncommon inhabitant of rocky coral reefs.

References

inaequalis
Fish of the Pacific Ocean
Fish of the Indian Ocean
Taxa named by John Ernest Randall